The 2014 Palau Soccer League is the ninth season of association football competition in Palau, and it also marks ten years since the league began in 2004. The 2014 League was competed by five teams from Palau. The league will be played in a round-tobin format, with the top four teams qualifying for the semi-finals. This is the first season of football in Palau since the 2012 Fall season, as that season stretched into 2013. The round robin stage began on April 13, and will end on June 15. The Semi-finals and Final will then take place on June 22 and June 29 respectively.

Match format
Unlike other seasons (and other association football matches), the matches of the 2014 Palau Soccer League have a set of unique rules. These are:
Teams will be 9-a-side, instead of the usual 11-a-side.
Matches will be 60 minutes long (30 minutes per half), instead of the usual 90 minutes.

Teams
Five teams will compete in this season of the Palau Soccer League. All matches will played at the PCC Track & Field Stadium in Koror, home stadium to all the teams. This is due to the lack of suitable venues for soccer matches in Palau. The teams for 2014 (listed in alphabetical order) are:
Kramers FC
Lyon FC
New Stars FC
Surangel Kings FC
Team Friendship FC

The location of the PCC Track & Field Stadium, where all games will take place:

League stage

League standings

Results
The fixture list was announced on the Palau Soccer Association website.

Week 1

Week 2

Week 3

Week 4

Week 5

Week 6

Week 7

Week 8

Week 9

Week 10

Knockout stage

Semi-finals

Final

References

Palau Soccer League seasons
Palau
Soccer